Danger One is a 2018 action comedy film directed by Tom Oesch, written by Steffen Schlachtenhaufen, and starring Tom Everett Scott, James Jurdi, Angelica Celaya, and Denis O'Hare. The film was acquired by Freestyle Releasing, the digital division of Byron Allen Entertainment Studios, and released theatrically and via digital platforms on September 14, 2018.

Plot
When paramedics Dean and Eric get a 911 call that leads them to discover a million dollars sewn into the clothes of a dying man, erratic Dean persuades reluctant Eric to keep the money. When their colleagues, the dangerously seductive Brie and the temperamental fireman Max, learn of the matter, things grow more complicated as internal greed, betrayal, and double crosses ensue. Making matters even worse is an eccentric, opera-loving bag man who is on the hunt for the money as well. As twists, turns, and mayhem pile up, Dean and Eric soon discover that in the ambulance business, life or death are only one call away.

Cast
 Tom Everett Scott as Dean
 James Jurdi as Eric
 Angelica Celaya as Brie
 Denis O’Hare as Craddock
 Damon Dayoub as Max
 Michael O'Neill as Beckwith
 Charles Shaughnessy as Akkerman
 Julissa Bermudez as Montez
 Kelly Frye as Valerie
 Stephen A. Chang as Wong

Production

The screenplay was written in the aftermath of the Great Recession and intended as an indictment of capitalism. The filmmakers wanted to tell a story about the anxiety and anger of working men and women who fear an uncertain future in an economy they’re told is strong. The script was also inspired by the director’s upbringing (his father was a medical doctor) and the ‘80s/‘90s buddy action comedies that he and the writer had grown up with.

Tom Everett Scott joined the production only two days before cameras started rolling. Other actors that were considered for the role were Bokeem Woodbine, Seann William Scott, and Michael Rapaport.

Damon Dayoub was initially cast as one of the corrupt ICE agents. But when the filmmakers couldn’t decide between Angelica Celaya and Julissa Bermudez for the role of Brie, they cast them both: Bermudez took over the ICE agent role from Dayoub who then went on to play firefighter Max instead.

Prior to filming, director Tom Oesch spent a week choreographing all the fight scenes in the producer’s backyard. Because of the tight schedule, however, there was no time for stunt rehearsals ahead of principal photography and so the actors all had to quickly learn the choreography on set.

Most of the ambulance interiors were “cheated” in front of three large rear-projection screens that had been set up inside the same warehouse that doubled as the paramedics’ headquarters. That warehouse was unfortunately also located right next door to a recycling plant, which made so much noise that a large portion of the dialog had to be re-recorded in post-production.

Filming lasted 23 days. It took place in Los Angeles, Anaheim, Vernon, and Griffith Park.

The initial director’s cut was a few minutes shorter than the final cut that was eventually shown in theaters.

Reception

David Duprey of That Moment In rated it 3 1/2 out of 5 stars and called it “a clever comedy with a string of smart turns and a genuinely entertaining style that give it plenty to keep it in the black.” He added that “what works best in all this is Oesch’s direction, his quick cuts and closeups helping a lot in giving it some momentum as it pushes towards its chaotic end. This is a good looking movie.”

Writing for Horror Geek Life, Frankie Torok gave it 3 out of 5 stars and wrote that it is “a fun movie, with some great performances and one hell of a climax”, adding that “The stand-out performances definitely come from Scott and O’Hare. Dean’s a well crafted, ego-centric, charismatic nightmare, with not a single ounce of conscience, but as it turns out, a fairly big heart.”

Remy Cashman of HorrorBuzz wrote that the film “features strong performances from leads played by Tom Everett Scott, Damon Dayoub, and James Jurdi” and added that “a hand-held camera can be overwhelming but it works well for this film to reflect its overall energy and tone.”

References

External links
 
 
 GeekTyrant
 HorrorNews.net
 28 Days Later Analysis
 BroadwayWorld
 Variety
 LA Confidential Magazine

2018 films
2018 action comedy films
American action comedy films
Films set in Los Angeles
Films shot in Los Angeles
Entertainment Studios films
2010s English-language films
2010s American films